Polytela cliens is a species of moth of the family Noctuidae. It is found through North Africa and the Sahara to Israel, Jordan, the Arabian Peninsula and to southern Iran.

Adults are on wing from February to March. There is one generation per year. Part of the pupae diapause up to several years.

Recorded food plants include Dipcadi serotinum and Pancratium tortuosum.

External links
 Hadeninae of Israel

Glottulinae
Insects of Chad
Insects of Ethiopia
Insects of West Africa
Moths of the Middle East
Moths described in 1874
Moths of Africa